Tanacetum mucronulatum is a species of flowering plant in the daisy family Asteraceae, endemic to central and northern Portugal. It inhabits edges of woods and Quercus coccifera and hedges, on ultrabasic, schist or limestone soils.

References

mucronulatum
Endemic flora of Portugal
Endemic flora of the Iberian Peninsula
Plants described in 1958